The following is an overview of public housing estates in Tseung Kwan O, including Home Ownership Scheme (HOS), Private Sector Participation Scheme (PSPS), and Tenants Purchase Scheme (TPS) estates.

History 

With the exception of Tsui Lam Estate, King Ming Court and Hong Sing Garden, all the public housing and HOS estates in Tseung Kwan O are built on the reclaimed land of Junk Bay.

In the 1990s, cracks were found at various places around On Ning Garden, Fu Ning Garden, Tong Ming Court, Beverly Garden and Bauhinia Garden. The estates were also found unusual soil settlement on their reclaimed land when the MTR Tseung Kwan O line was being constructed. After investigation, the government explained that the settlement occurred due to consolidation of soil layers overlying the bedrock when groundwater was lost to the sewage collection tunnels and not adequately replenished from the surface. But the government emphasized that the buildings built on the reclaimed land were still safe.

Overview

Estates

Bauhinia Garden 

Bauhinia Garden is a HOS and PSPS estate, located near Tseung Kwan O Plaza, The Grandiose, Tseung Kwan O station. It was jointly developed by the Hong Kong Housing Authority and Shui On Group. It consists of 8 residential blocks built on the reclaimed land and completed in 2001. In the 1990s, it suffered serious unusual ground settlement when Tseung Kwan O line was being constructed.

Beverly Garden 

Beverly Garden is a HOS and PSPS estate, located near Tseung Kwan O Plaza, The Grandiose, Tseung Kwan O station. It consists of 10 residential blocks built on the reclaimed land and completed in 1998. In the 1990s, it suffered serious unusual ground settlement when Tseung Kwan O line was being constructed.

Choi Ming Court 

Choi Ming Court is a public estate and a HOS/PSPS estate in Tiu Keng Leng. It is the seventh public housing estate. It consists of 10 residential blocks (4 for rental and 6 for HOS) and a shopping centre completed in 2001.

Chung Ming Court 

Chung Ming Court is a HOS estate, near Hau Tak Estate. It has only 5 blocks built in 1993.

Fu Ning Garden 

Fu Ning Garden is the first HOS and PSPS estate in Hang Hau Area, located near Hang Hau Village and Tseung Kwan O Hospital. It was jointly developed by the Hong Kong Housing Authority and Tak Wing Investment (Holdings) Limited (Renamed as New Smart Energy Group Limited) in 1990. It consists of 6 residential blocks and a shopping arcade built on the reclaimed land. In the 1990s, it suffered unusual ground settlement when Tseung Kwan O line was being constructed.

Hau Tak Estate 

Hau Tak Estate is the fourth public housing estate. Built between 1993 and 1994, the estate comprises 6 blocks of Harmony I style, providing more than 4,000 rental flats.

Hin Ming Court 

Hin Ming Court is a HOS estate, near Ming Tak Estate. It has only 1 block built in 1996.

Ho Ming Court 

Ho Ming Court is a HOS estate, near King Lam Estate. It has only 1 block built in 1990.

Hong Sing Garden 
Hong Sing Garden is a HOS and PSPS estate, near Tsui Lam Estate and King Ming Court. It is built at a hill adjacent to Po Lam Road North overlooking Tseung Kwan O Tunnel. It is the only PSPS estate that is not built on the reclaimed land. It was jointly developed by the Hong Kong Housing Authority and Shui On Group. It has 5 blocks built in 1989.

Jolly Place 

Jolly Place is a Senior Citizen Residence Scheme court in Hang Hau, Tseung Kwan O, near Hang Hau station. It is one of this kind of elderly housing in Hong Kong, developed by the Hong Kong Housing Society. It offers middle-class elder citizen to enjoy lifelong residence by paying an amount of rent in lump sum or by instalments.

Kin Ming Estate 

Kin Ming Estate is the eighth public housing estate, and consists of 10 housing blocks completed in 2003.

Kin Ming Estate was formerly the site of Tiu Keng Leng Cottage Area, an area settled by Kuomintang Army in Hong Kong after Chinese Civil War ended in 1949. After the area was demolished in 1997, a massive clearance, reclamation and redevelopment programme was carried out. The Tiu Keng Leng slope was flattened into two huge platforms to construct Kin Ming Estate and Choi Ming Court on the reclaimed land afterwards.

Kin Ming Estate was originally an HOS court called Kin Ming Court, but it was changed to rental housing finally and renamed to the current name.



King Lam Estate 

King Lam Estate is a TPS estate, and the third public housing estate. The estate has a total of 7 blocks of residential towers built in 1990. Some of the flats were sold to tenants through Tenants Purchase Scheme Phase 4 in 2001.

King Ming Court 

King Ming Court is a HOS estate, near Tsui Lam Estate. It is only HOS estate built at a hill, but not on the reclaimed land. It has 3 blocks built in 1988.

Kwong Ming Court 

Kwong Ming Court is a HOS estate, near Sheung Tak Estate. It has 7 blocks built in 1998.

Mount Verdant 

Mount Verdant is a court under the Subsidized Sale Flats Project developed by Hong Kong Housing Society in Chui Ling Road, Tiu King Leng, Tseung Kwan O, near Kin Ming Estate. It comprises single 38-storey tower with total 330 units ranging from 271 to 684 square feet.

The court was sold together with another court, Terrace Concerto in Tuen Mun, in 2017, at prices between HK$2.19 million and HK$6.23 million, or about 30 percent less than market prices. It is expected to complete in 2021.

Ming Tak Estate 

Ming Tak Estate is the fifth public housing estate. Built in 1996, the estate comprises 2 blocks of Harmony I style.

On Ning Garden 

On Ning Garden is a HOS and PSPS estate, located near Hang Hau station. It was jointly developed by Hong Kong Housing Authority and Hening Investment. It consists of 6 residential blocks built on the reclaimed land and completed in 1991. In the 1990s, it suffered serious unusual ground settlement when Tseung Kwan O line was being constructed.

Po Lam Estate 

Po Lam Estate is a TPS estate and the first public housing estate. The estate has a total of 7 blocks of residential towers with 5,272 units. In 2004, some of the flats (Po Kim House excluded) were sold to tenants through Tenants Purchase Scheme Phase 6A.

Po Ming Court 

Po Ming Court is a HOS estate, near Sheung Tak Estate. It has 2 blocks built in 1998.

Radiant Towers

Sheung Tak Estate 

Sheung Tak Estate is the sixth public housing estate. Built in 1998 and 2003 respectively, the estate comprises 9 blocks of Harmony I and Small Household Block styles, and a shopping centre.

Shin Ming Estate

Shin Ming Estate comprises two blocks housing 2,000 flats. It is designed to accommodate 4,200 people and opened in 2011.

The Pinnacle 

The Pinnacle is a Sandwich Class Housing Scheme estate, near Po Lam station. It was developed by the Hong Kong Housing Society in 1999. It has 4 blocks in total. Not all units were sold before the subsidized-sale scheme was stopped, but the government released the rest of the units in 2010. The Pinnacle has been plagued with complaints of shoddy construction from the beginning, as well as from new homeowners who bought remaining apartments in 2010, believing the earlier issues were fixed.

Tong Ming Court 

Tong Ming Court is a HOS estate, near Sheung Tak Estate. It has 3 blocks built in 1999.

Tsui Lam Estate

Tsui Lam Estate is a TPS estate to the west of Po Lam. It consists of 8 residential buildings completed in 1988. It is the second public housing estate, and it is the only public housing estate which was not built on the reclaimed land. In 2005, some of the flats were sold to tenants through Tenants Purchase Scheme Phase 6B. There are some basic facilities, such as a sports centre, a shopping mall, two kindergarten schools, several playgrounds, colleges, elderly services and a clinic. The population is largely elderly. 
Since Tsui Lam Estate is located at the middle of the mountain and near the forest, the air temperature is usually about 2 °C to 3 °C lower than the city.

Transit
There is a steep slope near the main road for residents to walk directly from Tsui Lam to Po Lam. It takes 10 minutes to walk there.
There are also public buses 296M, 93A, 98C and minibus 17M for residents' commuting.

Animals found in Tsui Lam Estate
As the estate is near a forest, birds and insects are easily found. In summer, mosquitoes appear frequently and parents need to protect the kids in the playground. Once, a wild monkey and a wild boar were discovered and the government services took them away and released them in the forest. No damages or injuries occurred.

Verbena Heights 

Verbena Heights is a public housing estate on the reclaimed land in Po Lam, Tseung Kwan O, Hong Kong, located near Po Lam station. It was developed by the Hong Kong Housing Society in 1996 and 1997. It consists of 7 residential blocks with a total of 1894 saleable units and 971 rental units. It is an attempt to design environmentally-responsible housing. It received a Silver Medal at the 1998 Hong Kong Institute of Architects Annual Awards.

Wo Ming Court 

Wo Ming Court is a HOS estate, near Ming Tak Estate. It has 4 blocks built in 1999.

Yan Ming Court 

Yan Ming Court is a HOS estate, near Po Lam Estate, Ying Ming Court, Po Lam station and Metro City. It has 5 blocks built in 1990.

Yee Ming Estate 

Yee Ming Estate is a public rental estate in Tsueng Kwan O town centre. It consists of three residential blocks comprising 2,059 flats. The towers are 32-33 storeys in height and will accommodate a projected population of about 5,700.

Ying Ming Court 

Ying Ming Court is a HOS estate, near Po Lam Estate, Yan Ming Court, Po Lam station and Metro City. It has 5 blocks built in 1989.

Yu Ming Court 

Yu Ming Court is a HOS estate, near Hau Tak Estate. It has only 2 blocks built in 1994.

Yuk Ming Court 

Yuk Ming Court is a HOS estate, near Ming Tak Estate. It has only 3 blocks built in 1996.

Yung Ming Court 

Yung Ming Court is a Home Ownership Scheme court in Chi Shin Street, Tseung Kwan O along Tseung Kwan O Eastern Channel, near Yee Ming Estate and Savannah, with a few walking distance to MTR Tseung Kwan O station. It comprises 2 blocks with 1,395 flats in total, which was the largest number of units among the six HOS courts (other five are Kwun Tak Court, Hoi Tak Court, Sheung Man Court, Kam Fai Court, Yuk Wo Court) sold in 2019 - with four sizes between 282 and 568 square feet. It is expected to complete in 2020.

References 

Tseung Kwan O
 
 
 
 
 
 

zh:寶盈花園